Raymond W. "Ray" Schnittker (born February 11, 1958, in Buffalo, New York) is a driver, trainer and owner of Standardbred harness racing horses who is also a Director of the United States Trotting Association His successful horses includes Hambletonian Stakes winner Deweycheatumnhowe.

In 2008, Ray Schnittker was voted the Dan Patch Trainer of the Year Award by the United States Harness Writers Association (USHWA).

References 

Living people
1958 births
American horse trainers
Dan Patch Award winners